Casati is an Italian surname. Notable people with the surname include:

 Alessandro Casati (1881–1955), Italian academic, commentator and politician
 Ambrogio Casati (1897–1977), Italian painter
 Domenico Casati (born 1943), retired Italian professional football player
 Francesco Casati (1620–1702), Roman Catholic prelate
 Gabrio Casati (1798–1873), Italian politician
 Gaetano Casati (1838–1902), Italian explorer of Africa
 Giulio Casati (born 1942), Italian emeritus professor of Theoretical Physics
 Luisa Casati (1881–1957), Italian patroness of the arts
 Mario Casati (born 1944), Italian boxer
 Michelle Casati or Michelle Torres, American retired professional tennis player
 Paolo Casati (1617–1707), Italian mathematician
 Pietro Casati (1891–1956), Italian racing cyclist

See also 
 Casatenovo

Italian-language surnames